The men's 100 metres at the 2012 IPC Athletics European Championships was held at Stadskanaal Stadium from 24–28 July.

Medalists
Results given by IPC Athletics.

Results

T11
Heats

Final

T12
Heats

Final

T13
Final

T34
Final

T35
Final

T36
Heats

Final

T37
Final

T38
Final

T42
Final

T44
Final

T46
Final

T51/53
Final
(Non-medal event)

T54
Final

See also
List of IPC world records in athletics

References

100 metres
100 metres at the World Para Athletics European Championships